Mario Alberto Vanemerak (born October 21, 1963, in Firmat) is an Argentine football manager and former footballer.

In his club career that started in 1982, Vanemerak played for Vélez Sársfield, Millonarios, Racing Club, Quilmes, Deportivo Quito and Provincial Osorno.

Mario was a midfielder emerged from the divisions Vélez Sársfield. He made his debut in the first team of Vélez Sársfield in the year 1982 with only 19 years old. Between 1982 and 1987, Vanemerak played 175 games and made 20 goals. In the 1987 Vanemerak was transferred to Millonarios in Colombia.  In Millonarios Vanemerak won the Championship in 1987 and 1988.

External links
 Mario Vanemerak at BDFA.com.ar 
 

1963 births
People from General López Department
Living people
Argentine footballers
Argentina under-20 international footballers
Argentina youth international footballers
Club Atlético Vélez Sarsfield footballers
Racing Club de Avellaneda footballers
Millonarios F.C. players
Quilmes Atlético Club footballers
Provincial Osorno footballers
Provincial Osorno managers
Argentine Primera División players
Argentine expatriate footballers
Expatriate footballers in Chile
Argentine expatriate sportspeople in Chile
Argentine expatriate sportspeople in Colombia
S.D. Quito footballers
Argentine football managers
Millonarios F.C. managers
Boyacá Chicó F.C. footballers
Association football midfielders
Expatriate footballers in Colombia
Sportspeople from Santa Fe Province
Boyacá Chicó managers
Patriotas Boyacá managers